In the Swiss Air Force, an aircraft usually isn't deployed permanently to a given Squadron, which is especially true of the [militia] squadrons who are not permanently in service. Aircraft are used across several squadrons. Even the aircraft related to the Squadron, such as the F/A-18C J-5017 from 17 Squadron, will be used by other squadrons. Older aircraft will often be retired from front-line service to support squadrons, for example, the Hawker Hunter from a fighter-bomber to a target tug. Two full-scale Hugo Wolf F/A-18C simulators, tail numbers X-5098 and X-5099, are non-flying training simulators for ground crew and not part of any squadron.

Other aircraft units

References

Farbgebung und Kennzeichen der Schweizer Militäraviatik 1914-1950 (Georg Hoch) 

Squadrons of the Swiss Air Force